Marina Petrella (born in Roma, 23 August 1954) is a former member of the terrorist Italian left wing group the Red Brigades. She was convicted to life sentence for murder.

Biography

A former school teacher in the middle of the 1970s she joined a terrorist group called the Red Brigades. Together with her husband, Luigi Novelli, she was arrested twice, but was never sent to jail because a verdict was not reached in time.
In 1993, she left Italy to avoid being arrested following her conviction of killing a policeman, various attempted murders, and other minor offenses. She moved to Paris where, thanks to the Mitterrand doctrine, she started a new life. She was arrested by the French, but the government of Nicolas Sarkozy announced that Petrella would not be extradited to Italy on medical grounds.

On April 28 2021 she was again arrested together with six other former Red Brigades members living in France.

References

1954 births
Italian assassins
Italian communists
Red Brigades
Living people
Italian exiles